Arabi (also Romanized as Ārābī) is a village in Kohurestan Rural District, in the Central District of Khamir County, Hormozgan Province, Iran. At the 2006 census, its population was 747, in 130 families.

References 

Populated places in Khamir County